Hillel at the University of Illinois Urbana-Champaign (also known as The Cohen Center for Jewish Life or Illini Hillel) is the first Hillel: The Foundation for Jewish Campus Life in the world. It was established in Champaign, Illinois in 1923. Today the organization serves around 3,500 Jewish students and their peers at the University of Illinois Urbana-Champaign and Parkland College.

History

Hillel: The Foundation for Jewish Campus Life was founded at the University of Illinois Urbana-Champaign in 1923. In 1921, a small group of college students at the University of Illinois came together under the wing of a local rabbinic student named Benjamin Frankel. The 24-year-old, who was interning at Temple Sinai in Champaign, described his Jewish peers as being in a state of "intellectual flux."

As the children of recent Jewish immigrants, many were struggling to strike a balance between being American and being Jewish. Mrs. Hattie Kauffman, a prominent woman in the local Jewish community, encouraged Benjamin Frankel to reside in Champaign-Urbana as Sinai's part-time rabbi. He accepted this part-time pulpit and a small stipend to remain in the area.

Frankel worked closely with the university's Jewish student population of approximately 300 students to strengthen their dual identities. Frankel proceeded to organize the foundation with no financial support at first, beside his modest salary he received from Sinai. When he was ordained in 1923, the group began meeting more formally – in a rented room above a barbershop on the south side of the 600 block of East Green Street in Champaign. Rabbi Frankel and his students were ready to expand but they needed resources... and a name. Frankel reached out to the local B'nai B'rith for support and campus leaders started to pay attention. In 1924, Frankel attended the national B'nai B'rith convention to appeal support for Hillel. Edward Chauncey Baldwin, a non-Jewish professor of English at the university, famously challenged Chicago Jewish leader Rabbi Louis Mann, asking: "Don't you think the time has come when a Jewish student might educate his mind without losing his soul?"

From there, Frankel, Baldwin and Mann began working together and their fundraising efforts quickly developed the part-time student program into a full-time organization. Impressively, the men raised the entire first-year budget – $12,000 – in a single luncheon. The as-yet-unnamed Hillel was off and running.
It didn't take long for Frankel and a board of lay leaders to assign the name Hillel, a tribute to one of Judaism's greatest teachers. One year after agreeing to take the foundation under its wing, B'nai B'rith allocated $1 million for the expansion of Hillel throughout the country. Frankel was appointed as Hillel's first national director. The social impact of Hillel was felt on the University of Illinois campus soon after the foundation's creation. Only 100 of 350 Jewish college students in 1923 were willing to identify as Jews during fall registration. In 1928, a mere four years later, almost all of the 650 Jewish students enrolled identified themselves as such.

Rabbi Frankel's friend and successor, Dr. Abram L. Sachar, came to Champaign-Urbana in 1923. Until his resignation in 1929, Dr. Sachar served in the History department at the University of Illinois, specializing in modern English history. During that time, he also served as faculty advisor in Hillel and obtained a license to perform marriages at Sinai Temple and Hillel, because he was not an ordained rabbi. In February 1928, Dr. Sachar became permanent director of the Illinois Hillel chapter. In 1933, he became the first full-time national director, and continued until 1947. Under his leadership, Hillel grew from 9 chapters to 157 chapters throughout the United States and Canada.

By the time of his tragic and untimely death in 1929 at age 30, Rabbi Frankel had helped establish chapters at University of Wisconsin, Ohio State University, University of Michigan, University of Southern California, and Cornell University, as well as the University of Illinois Urbana-Champaign. Today, Illini Hillel serves approximately 3,000 Jewish undergraduate and 500 graduate students.

Building 
From 1923 until 1950, Hillel used several buildings to host programs and events. Those same buildings served not only as the home of the UI Hillel, but as the national Hillel headquarters as well.  The first building built solely for Hillel, designed by Max Abramovitz, the architect who designed the Assembly Hall and Krannert Center for the Performing Arts on campus, was erected in 1950–1951. After construction, the building was named the Benjamin Frankel Memorial in honor of the late Rabbi Frankel, who was the first director of the local Hillel Foundation. Among those attending the building's dedication was the former first lady, Eleanor Roosevelt. The building was well-equipped to provide event opportunities to the Jewish student community, as the old building seated 100 for religious services in the chapel and the auditorium accommodated 300 for lectures, dramatics, social gatherings, and recreation. The library, seminar rooms, and social rooms were used by both students and the community. Kitchens were included, as well as the caretaker's and administrative suites. To cater to the student's needs, the original Hillel Foundation offered more than twenty courses, for both graduate and undergraduate students, concentrating in Hebrew studies and Jewish culture and society.

After talks of expanding and building renovation, Hillel's new facility: The Margie K. and Louis N. Cohen Center for Jewish Life, opened on December 4, 2007. The state-of-the-art building, designed by the Chicago firm of Amstadter Architects, has 800 more square feet than the old building. The Margie K. and Louis N. Cohen Center for Jewish Life includes a large and comfortable student lounge, an upper level deck for BBQs and the Hillel Sukkah, Wireless internet access, dairy and meat Kosher kitchens, drop-in coffee bar and program space of varying sizes.

On May 15, 2018, the Champaign City Council unanimously approved putting up an honorary street name on the John street block between 5th and 6th street, where Hillel's buildings have been standing since 1949. The Honorary Rabbi Ben Frankel Way sign was installed on July 7, 2018 and will remain up for 10 years.

Mission
Hillel's mission is to enrich the lives of Jewish undergraduate and graduate students so that they may enrich the Jewish people and the world.  Hillel seeks to create a pluralistic, welcoming and inclusive environment for Jewish college students: an environment where students are encouraged to grow intellectually, spiritually and socially.  Hillel helps students find their own balance in being distinctively Jewish and universally human.  It does this by providing opportunities to pursue tzedek (social justice); helping students to engage with critical Jewish issues in the US, Israel and around the world through experiences in Israel, Eastern Europe and helping to "repair the world" (tikkun olam).  Hillel encourages Jewish learning and celebration and provides students with an opportunity to explore culture and the arts.  Hillel creates a variety of ways that students can advocate for and support Jews in Israel and around the world.  Hillel seeks to inspire every Jewish student to find their own approach to making an enduring commitment to Jewish life.
Illini Hillel has programs daily for undergraduate and graduate students to participate in.

Programs
Illini Hillel has programs daily for undergraduate and graduate students to participate in.

On Mondays, students can enjoy a free kosher lunch while discussing a variety of thought-provoking Jewish topics at Lunch & Learn.

Dinner & Discussion takes place every Tuesday, as students eat a free kosher dinner and discuss Jewish texts.

For students who want to practice and improve their Hebrew, Hillel hosts Café Ivrit at a local coffee shop Espresso Royale on Wednesdays.

Every Friday at noon, Illini Hillel hosts Zionist Food for Thought, where University of Illinois students discuss issues relating to Israel while eating a free pizza lunch. Friday evenings are a particularly special time at Hillel. Following the separate Reform, Conservative and Orthodox minyanim, the community comes together for a traditional Shabbat meal.

Saturday mornings provide another opportunity for students to pray with minyanim. Hillel's Conservative community, also known as the Jewish U of I Conservative Egalitarian (JUICE), offers 3–4 Saturday minyans per semester. Hillel's Orthodox Minyan is offered daily at Hillel. On Saturday afternoons, free kosher lunch is offered to all students and in the evening, Hillel hosts a free kosher dinner for the third meal, following which students sing seuda shlishit songs.

One of Illini Hillel's most beloved weekly programs is Sandy's Bagel Brunch. From 11am-1pm every Sunday, students come together for bagels, lox, cream cheese, coffee cake, and orange juice to recharge for the week ahead. The Bagel Brunch has been named in memory of Sanford "Sandy" Takiff, who served on the boards of the Chicago Bulls and White Sox.

In addition to these standard weekly programs, Hillel offers many other opportunities for students to get involved. Illini Public Affairs Committee, or IlliniPAC, is a student organization focused on strengthening the U.S.-Israel relationship through education and advocacy. They work closely on lobbying and working with up and coming leaders on campus and in the local community.  Illini Students Supporting Israel (ISSI) is an organization for Israel-related dialogue, engagement, and education at the University of Illinois Urbana-Champaign. ISSI seeks to accomplish these goals though discussions, speakers, and innovative, student-run programs. Every summer break and winter break, Hillel also sends a group of University of Illinois students on a Taglit-Birthright Israel trip. This free, 10-day trip sends Jewish students ages 18–26 to Israel for the first time. Illini Hillel works closely with the organization, Shorashim, to connect students to Israeli participants for the entire 10-day trip. Tikkun Chambana is an inclusive, environmental club committed to protecting our natural resources and educating others through a combination of workdays, programs, and fundraising.

Student President
 Morris Sostrin - 1923
 Howard L Cohlan – 1940
 Jeremy Fine – 2001–2004
 Jessica Melhado (Cahavanagh) – 2006
 Brittany Abramowicz – 2008–2009
 Sammy Marks – 2009–2010
 Lena Shapiro – 2010–2011
 Joshua Gibbs – 2011–2012
 Roxie Zeller – 2012
 Robert Schnitzer – 2013
 Joseph Winner – 2014
 Evan Frank – 2015
 Dakota Karson – 2016
 Irene Zharnitzky – 2017–2018
 Itamar Steiner – 2019
 Mollie Kramer – 2020
 Alena Fishkin – 2021

Previous Directors
 Rabbi Benjamin Frankel (1923–1927)
 Rabbi Judah Goldin (1939-1943)
 Rabbi Albert Silverman 
 Rabbi Judah Goldin (-1947)
 Rabbi Sanford E. Saperstein (1947-)
 Rabbi Samuel Berkowitz (-1953)
 Rabbi Benjamin Rudavsky (1953-1956)
 Rabbi Hirsch Cohen (1961–1964) 
 Rabbi Nathan Gaynor (1965-1969)
 Rabbi Ed Feld (1969-1972)
 Rabbi Steven Steinberg (1972–1977)
 Howard Alpert (1977–1980)
 Rabbi Stephen Sniderman (1980–1985)
 Mark Mulgay (1985–1986)
 Rabbi Jeffrey Falick (1989–1996)
 Andrea Hoffman (1996–1997)
 Herschel Worsh (1997–1998)
 Alan Potash (1998–2003)
 Joel Schwitzer (2003–2010)
 Rabbi Raif Melhado (2010–2011)
 Rabbi Rogerio Cukierman (2011–2013)
 Erez Cohen (2013–present)

References

External links
 Illini Hillel's Website
 Illini Hillel's Facebook

Jewish organizations based in the United States
Jewish organizations established in 1923
University of Illinois Urbana-Champaign student organizations